The Budderoo National Park is a  national park that is located in the Illawarra region of New South Wales, Australia; situated approximately  south southwest of Sydney.

Location and features

The National Parks & Wildlife Servicemanaged park is best known for the timber boardwalk through the Minnamurra rainforest. The park features waterfalls, picnic and barbecue areas, and a visitors centre.

Budderoo is part of the  Budderoo and Barren Grounds Important Bird Area which contains large numbers of endangered eastern bristlebirds, as well as smaller numbers of pilotbirds and rockwarblers, in a mosaic of sandstone heath and eucalypt woodland habitats.

Barren Grounds Nature Reserve is adjacent to the eastern border of the park; Yarrawa State Forest is not far from the park's western border.

See also

 Protected areas of New South Wales
 Carrington Falls
 Belmore Falls

References

External links

National parks of New South Wales
Protected areas established in 1986
1986 establishments in Australia
Important Bird Areas of New South Wales